James Pearson Wells (January 11, 1822 – August 24, 1893) was an Ontario farmer and political figure. He represented York North in the 1st Canadian Parliament as a member of the Liberal Party of Canada.

He was born in 1822 in Aurora, Upper Canada, the son of John Wells, was educated in York County and settled in King Township. Wells married Lydia Norman. He served on King Township council as reeve for the township from 1860 to 1863. He was elected to the Legislative Assembly of the Province of Canada in the North riding of York in 1863 and was elected to the federal parliament after Confederation. He died in Aurora in 1893 at the age of 74.

References 

 

1822 births
1896 deaths
Members of the Legislative Assembly of the Province of Canada from Canada West
Liberal Party of Canada MPs
Members of the House of Commons of Canada from Ontario
People from Aurora, Ontario
People from King, Ontario